The Yaque Group is a geologic group in the southern Dominican Republic. The shallow marine limestone preserves coral fossils dating back to the Late Miocene to Early Pliocene period.

See also 
 List of fossiliferous stratigraphic units in the Dominican Republic

References

Further reading 
 T. W. Vaughan, W. Cooke, D. D. Condit, C. P. Ross, W. P. Woodring and F. C. Calkins. 1921. A geological reconnaissance of the Dominican Republic. Geological Survey of the Dominican Republic Memoir 1:1-268

Geologic groups of North America
Geologic formations of the Dominican Republic
Neogene Dominican Republic
Limestone formations
Shallow marine deposits